Eswatini has a small population and maintains a small number of diplomatic missions. This is a list of diplomatic missions of Eswatini.

Africa

 Addis Ababa (Embassy)

 Rabat (Embassy)
 Laayoune (Consulate)

 Maputo (High Commission)

 Pretoria (High Commission)
 Johannesburg (Consulate)

America

 Washington, D.C. (Embassy)

Asia

 Kuwait City (Embassy)

 Kuala Lumpur (High Commission)

Doha (Embassy)

 Taipei (Embassy)

 Abu Dhabi (Embassy)

Europe

 Brussels (Embassy)

 London (High Commission)

Multilateral organisations
 African Union
Addis Ababa (Permanent Mission to the African Union)

Brussels (Mission to the European Union)

Geneva (Permanent Mission to the United Nations)
New York City (Permanent Mission to the United Nations)

Gallery

See also
 Foreign relations of Eswatini

References

Ministry of Foreign Affairs and Trade of Swaziland

Diplomatic missions
Eswatini